Dmitriy Gordiyenko (born May 20, 1986) is a Kazakh swimmer, who specialized in individual medley events. He represented his nation Kazakhstan at the 2008 Summer Olympics, and has won a career total of four medals (three golds and one silver) in a major international competition, spanning three editions of the Asian Indoor Games (2005, 2007, and 2009).

Gordiyenko competed for the Kazakh squad in a medley double at the 2008 Summer Olympics in Beijing with five days apart from each other. Leading up to the Games, he scored a time of 2:01.49 (200 m individual medley) and 4:27.15 (400 m individual medley), respectively, to take the medley crowns and clear the FINA B-cut each at the Kazakhstan Open Championships in Almaty. In the 400 m individual medley, Gordiyenko rallied from fourth towards the freestyle leg in the opening heat to fight off against three fastest swimmers in a sprint challenge, but could not catch the hard-charging Croatian Nikša Roki to finish only with a second-place time and twenty-sixth overall in 4:25.20. Four nights later, in the 200 m individual medley, Gordiyenko touched out Germany's Markus Deibler on the final stretch by nearly half of his body length to save the seventh spot in 2:03.92, but fell short for the semifinals with a thirty-seventh overall placement from the prelims.

References

External links
NBC Olympics Profile

1986 births
Living people
Kazakhstani male medley swimmers
Olympic swimmers of Kazakhstan
Swimmers at the 2008 Summer Olympics
Swimmers at the 2006 Asian Games
Swimmers at the 2010 Asian Games
People from Karaganda Region
Asian Games competitors for Kazakhstan
21st-century Kazakhstani people